|-
| Hadrovići
| Bugojno
| 
|-
| Hadžići
| Goražde
| 
|-
| Hadžići 
| 
| Sarajevo Canton
|-
| Hajradinovići
| 
| 
|-
| Hamzići
| Čitluk
| 
|-
| Hapstići
| 
| 
|-
| Harambašići
| 
| 
|-
| Hardomilje
| 
| 
|-
| Hasanovići
| 
| 
|-
| Herići
| 
| 
|-
| Hladila
| 
| 
|-
| Hodovo (part)
| Stolac
| 
|-
| Homatlije
| 
| 
|-
| Homolje
| 
| 
|-
| Hondići
| 
| 
|-
| Hotanj
| 
| 
|-
| Hrančići
| 
| 
|-
| Hrašljani
| 
| 
|-
| Hrgud (part)
| Stolac
| 
|-
| Hrid
| Goražde
| 
|-
| Hrušanj
| 
| 
|-
| Hubjeri
| 
| 
|-
| Hum
| Bugojno
| 
|-
| Humac
| Bugojno
| 
|-
| Humac
| Ljubuški
| 
|}

Lists of settlements in the Federation of Bosnia and Herzegovina (A-Ž)